Chahardangeh Rural District is in Chahardangeh District of Eslamshahr County, Tehran province, Iran. At the National Census of 2011, the population of the rural district was below the reporting threshold. At the most recent census of 2016, the population of the rural district was 1,607 in 469 households. The largest of its two villages was Ali Abad Qajar, with 1,607 people; the other village, Khomarabad, showed a population of zero.

References 

Eslamshahr County

Rural Districts of Tehran Province

Populated places in Tehran Province

Populated places in Eslamshahr County

fa:دهستان چهاردانگه (اسلامشهر)